Gary Steiner is an American moral philosopher, and the John Howard Harris Professor of Philosophy at Bucknell University. Steiner's particular focus is animal rights, Descartes, and 19th- and 20th-century continental philosophy.

Works
Books
Descartes As a Moral Thinker: Christianity, Technology, Nihilism. Humanity Books, 2004.
Anthropocentrism and Its Discontents: The Moral Status of Animals in the History of Western Philosophy. University of Pittsburgh Press, 2005.
Animals and the Moral Community: Mental Life, Moral Status, and Kinship. Columbia University Press, 2008.
Animals and the Limits of Postmodernism. Columbia University Press, 2013.

Translations

Klaus Hartmann. "Marx's Capital from the Viewpoint of Transcendental Philosophy," Journal of the British Society for Phenomenology 24, 1993, pp. 157–171.
Karl Löwith. Martin Heidegger and European Nihilism. Columbia University Press, 1998.
Gerold Prauss. Knowing & Doing in Heidegger's Being & Time. Humanity Books, 1999.
Dominique Lestel. Eat This Book: A Carnivore's Manifesto. Columbia University Press, 2016.

Selected articles

"Rethinking the Cognitive Abilities of Animals," Julie A. Smith and Robert W. Mitchell (eds.). Experiencing Animals: Encounters Between Animal and Human Minds. Columbia University Press (forthcoming).
"Animal Rights and the Default of Postmodernism," Evangelos Protopapadakis (ed.). Animal Rights - Animal Liberation. Berlin: Logos Verlag (forthcoming).
Steiner, Gary. "Animal, Vegetable, Miserable", The New York Times, 21 November 2009.

See also
Animal cognition
 List of animal rights advocates

Notes

Further reading

Francione, Gary. "Discussion with Professor Gary Steiner", abolitionistapproach.com, 6 December 2009.
Steiner, Gary. "Tierrecht und die Grenzen des Postmodernismus", lecture at the University of Heidelberg, 15 March 2010.

American animal rights scholars
Animal cognition writers
Living people
21st-century American philosophers
Yale University alumni
Bucknell University faculty
University of California, Berkeley alumni
1956 births